Rafael Aparecido da Silva (born 7 April 1990), commonly known as Boquita, is a Brazilian footballer who plays for Esporte Clube Taubaté as a midfielder.

Honours
Corinthians
Copa São Paulo de Juniores: 2009
Campeonato Paulista: 2009
Copa do Brasil: 2009

Portuguesa
Campeonato Brasileiro Série B: 2011

CSA
 Campeonato Brasileiro Série C: 2017

References

External links

1990 births
Living people
Footballers from São Paulo
Brazilian footballers
Association football midfielders
Campeonato Brasileiro Série A players
Campeonato Brasileiro Série B players
Campeonato Brasileiro Série C players
Sport Club Corinthians Paulista players
Esporte Clube Bahia players
Associação Portuguesa de Desportos players
Clube Atlético Sorocaba players
Vila Nova Futebol Clube players
Marília Atlético Clube players
Brusque Futebol Clube players
Centro Sportivo Alagoano players
Grêmio Esportivo Brasil players
Clube Náutico Marcílio Dias players
Esporte Clube Taubaté players
Brazil under-20 international footballers